Distoechodon macrophthalmus (common name: red-wing fish) is a species of cyprinid in the genus Distoechodon. It only inhabits the Chenhai Lake in Yunnan, China and its population is rapidly declining.

References

Cyprinidae
Cyprinid fish of Asia
Freshwater fish of China